Ricardo Oliveira Bierhals (born 6 November 1990), known as Ricardo Bierhals, is a Brazilian professional footballer who plays as a centre-back for Pelotas.

Career
Ricardo Bierhals started his career playing with Brasil de Pelotas. He made his professional debut during the match against Caxias by the Campeonato Gaúcho of 2014.

References

1993 births
Living people
Sportspeople from Rio Grande do Sul
Brazilian footballers
Association football defenders
Grêmio Esportivo Brasil players
Esporte Clube Pelotas players
Campeonato Brasileiro Série C players
Campeonato Brasileiro Série D players